Hanbhi is an Alizai tribe of Kakars Pashtuns origin.

Demographics
Its main divisions are Adinzai, Sabdozai, Masuzai, Blochani,Ilyasani,Muradani, Bahadurani, Salarzai, Loharzai, Sonezai Essa zai and Hadezai. Languages are Pashto, Saraiki and Sindhi. People of this tribe are settled in all provinces of Pakistan; as, Rajanpur (Punjab); Jacobabad, Larkana, Ranipur (Sindh); Khyber Pakhtunkhwa province; Quetta, Sibi, Kachhi, Sohbat Pur, Naseerabad, jafarabad, Pishin, Loralai and Harnai (Balochistan). Hanbhi tribe hails from Afghanistan. Hanbhi has different stories of its descendent from Pashtun.

History
Hanbhi came from Taxila in the 1 BC and settled in Afghanistan, Pakistan & India. Mostly they work as peasants, tenants and labourers to curtail their poverty and run livelihood.

References

Durrani Pashtun tribes